Mamestra configurata, the Bertha armyworm, is a moth of the family Noctuidae. It is found in the western part of the North America (including Alberta, British Columbia, Washington, New Mexico, California) and Mexico.

Adults are grey black with a silvery-whitish kidney shaped spot and fringe on each forewing.

The larvae feed on canola. First feeding on the leaves, but later also feeding on the pods. Full-grown larvae drop to the ground in mid to late August to pupate.

References

Moths described in 1856
Mamestra
Moths of North America